The 1990 Penn Quakers football team was an American football team that represented the University of Pennsylvania during the 1990 NCAA Division I-AA football season. Penn tied for fourth in the Ivy League.

In their second year under head coach Gary Steele, the Quakers compiled a 3–7 record and were outscored 197 to 155. Joe Valerio and Brian Griffin were the team captains.

Penn's 3–4 conference record tied for fourth place in the Ivy League standings. The Quakers were outscored 138 to 123 by Ivy opponents. 

Penn played its home games at Franklin Field adjacent to the university's campus in Philadelphia, Pennsylvania.

Schedule

References

Penn
Penn Quakers football seasons
Penn Quakers football